Tilden High School may refer to:
Tilden High School (Chicago)
Samuel J. Tilden High School in New York